Claudio Cucinotta (born 22 January 1982) is an Italian cyclist.

Palmares

2007
National Team Pursuit Champion (with Alessandro De Marchi, Giairo Ermeti and Matteo Montaguti)
6th Scheldeprijs
9th Paris–Bruxelles
2008
National Scratch Champion
1st Stage 1 Tour of Slovenia
2010
1st Stages 3 & 7 Tour of Japan
8th GP Costa Degli Etruschi

References

1982 births
Living people
Italian male cyclists
Cyclists from Friuli Venezia Giulia